Filip Rogić (born 14 June 1993) is a Swedish professional footballer who plays as a midfielder for Thai League 1 club Buriram United. His parents were born in Croatia.

Club career

On 2 September 2019, he signed with the Russian Premier League club FC Orenburg. On 11 June 2020, his Orenburg contract was terminated by mutual consent.

References

External links

1993 births
Living people
Östersunds FK players
Örebro SK players
FC Orenburg players
Swedish footballers
Allsvenskan players
Superettan players
Filip Rogić
Russian Premier League players
Filip Rogić
People from Eskilstuna
Association football midfielders
Swedish people of Croatian descent
Swedish people of Serbian descent
Swedish expatriate footballers
Expatriate footballers in Russia
Swedish expatriate sportspeople in Russia
Sportspeople from Södermanland County